Revive & Restore is a California-based nonprofit that works to bring biotechnologies to conservation biology, with the mission to enhance biodiversity through the genetic rescue of endangered and extinct animals.

Activities
The group was incubated by the Long Now Foundation and co-founded by Stewart Brand and Ryan Phelan in 2012  with the idea of advancing the science of de-extinction of the passenger pigeon, the heath hen, and the woolly mammoth. Afterwards the group's work has expanded to bring back genetic diversity through the cloning of historic, cryopreserved cell lines.  This has resulted in the birth of "Elizabeth Ann" the first cloned US endangered species. The cells had been frozen for 32 years from deceased black-footed ferret named "Willa". Revive & Restore also helped with the restoration of a clone (named "Kurt") of Przewalski's horse ("the most endangered horse in the world"), from cells frozen 40 years previously. the result of a collaboration between San Diego Zoo Global, ViaGen Equine and Revive & Restore. The cloning was carried out by somatic cell nuclear transfer (SCNT), whereby a viable embryo is created by transplanting the DNA-containing nucleus of a somatic cell into an immature egg cell (oocyte) that has had its own nucleus removed, producing offspring genetically identical to the somatic cell donor. Since the oocyte used was from a domestic horse, this was an example of interspecies SCNT.

Other projects
Additional funded projects address the seven sea turtle species, Black-footed albatross, Pinto abalone, jonah crab, narwhal, Brown sea cucumber, coral, Xerces blue, jaguar, joshua tree, sunflower sea star, six whale species, takahē, binturong, Eastern quoll, chinook salmon, sun bear, and long-toed salamander.

Criticism
De-extinction has been criticized as too costly, consuming funds that could be used for other conservation goals, well as characterized as a distraction from currently endangered species. The dialog challenges us to consider “unintended” and “intended consequences”. There is concern both that “The American chestnut, for example, will not survive without intervention” and that using genetics to avert this is nevertheless unwarranted. Revive & Restore is also mentioned in the 2021 documentary film, "".

See also
 De-extinction
 Przewalski's horse
 Necrofauna
 Pleistocene Park
 Frozen Zoo

References

External links 

Rewilding advocates
Non-profit organizations based in California
Conservation and restoration organizations
Synthetic biology